The pale-legged hornero (Furnarius leucopus) is a species of bird in the family Furnariidae. It includes the Pacific hornero (F. leucopus cinnamomeus) and the Caribbean hornero (F. leucopus longirostris), which often are considered separate species.

It is found in Bolivia, Brazil, Colombia, Ecuador, Guyana, Peru, and Venezuela. It occurs in a wide range of wooded habitats, especially near water.

References

pale-legged hornero
Birds of the Amazon Basin
Birds of the Bolivian Amazon
Birds of Colombia
Birds of Ecuador
Birds of Peru
Birds of Venezuela
Birds of Brazil
Birds of the Caatinga
pale-legged hornero
Taxonomy articles created by Polbot